Regional elections were held in Denmark in March 1933. 11424 municipal council members were elected.

Results of regional elections
The results of the regional elections:

Municipal Councils

References

1933
Denmark
Elections
March 1933 events